Passalacqua is an Italian surname. Notable people with the surname include:

Connie Passalacqua Hayman, American journalist
Jose Rafael Passalacqua Santiago (1905–2006), Puerto Rican cardiologist and writer
Joseph Passalacqua (1797-1865), Italian Egyptologist
Juan Manuel García Passalacqua (1937–2010), Puerto Rican lawyer, writer and political analyst
Ubaldo Passalacqua (born 1918), Italian footballer
Azzo Passalacqua (1885-1967), Italian general
Joe Pass, (1929-1994) American guitarist, was born Joseph Anthony Passalaqua

Italian-language surnames